Fernando Armiñán (28 April 1927 – 1 June 1987) was a Spanish alpine skier. He competed in two events at the 1948 Winter Olympics. His cousin Jaime de Armiñán is a Spanish screenwriter and film director.

References

1927 births
1987 deaths
Spanish male alpine skiers
Olympic alpine skiers of Spain
Alpine skiers at the 1948 Winter Olympics
Sportspeople from Madrid
20th-century Spanish people